Tejada is a surname of Spanish origin. It is locational from the town of Tejada.

Distribution
The distribution of Spanish births, are most common in Seville with 9.57% of people with the surname and it being their first surname, Madrid (7.90%), Barcelona (7.85%), Granada (6.83%) and Badajoz (6.71%).

People
 Cosme Gómez Tejada de los Reyes (died c. 1661), Spanish writer, poet and dramatist
 Manuel de Velasco y Tejada (born 17th c.), Spanish commander
 Martín Fernández de Navarrete y Ximénez de Tejada (1765–1844), Spanish sailor and historian
 Miguel Lerdo de Tejada (1812–1861), Mexican statesman and leader of the Revolution of Ayutla
 Miguel Lerdo de Tejada (composer) (1869–1941), Mexican composer
 Sebastián Lerdo de Tejada (1823–1889), jurist and Liberal president of Mexico
 Manuel Aguirre de Tejada (1827–1911) Spanish politician and lawyer
 José Joaquín Tejada (1867–1934), Cuban painter
 José Luis Tejada Sorzano (1882–1938), 34th President of Bolivia, 23rd Vice President of Bolivia
Gabriel Gosálvez Tejada (1899–1957), Bolivian economist and diplomat
 Francisco Elías de Tejada y Spínola (1917–1978), Spanish scholar and politician
 Lidia Gueiler Tejada (1921–2011), 56th President of Bolivia
 Luis García Meza Tejada (1929–2018), 57th President of Bolivia
 Raquel Tejada (1940–2023), American actress
 Alberto Tejada Noriega (born 1956), Peruvian football referee
 John Tejada (born 1974), Mexican-American music producer
 Miguel Tejada (born 1974), Dominican baseball player
 Carlos Tejada (born 1980), Venezuelan volleyball player
 Luis Tejada (born 1982), Panamanian football player
 Francisco Jiménez Tejada (born 1986), Spanish football player
 Rubén Tejada (born 1989), Panamanian baseball player

References

Spanish-language surnames